In Greek mythology, Lycophron is a squire of Ajax the Greater during the Trojan War.

Mythology 
Lycophron was the son of Mastor and a native of Cythera, but became a fugitive after he had slain a man in his homeland. He fled to Salamis and dwelt there before the events of the war. During the siege of Troy, Lycophron was smitten by Hector upon the head just above the ear with a bright spear. This sharp bronze was hurled by the Trojan hero intended for the Salaminian prince but missed him and killed the Cytherean.

Note

References 

 Homer, The Iliad with an English Translation by A.T. Murray, Ph.D. in two volumes. Cambridge, MA., Harvard University Press; London, William Heinemann, Ltd. 1924. Online version at the Perseus Digital Library.
 Homer, Homeri Opera in five volumes. Oxford, Oxford University Press. 1920. Greek text available at the Perseus Digital Library.

Achaeans (Homer)